The 2019–20 Moldovan Cup was the 29th season of the annual Moldovan football cup competition. The competition started on 20 April 2019 with the preliminary round and concluded with the final on 30 June 2020. The winner qualifies for the first qualifying round of the 2020–21 UEFA Europa League.

Format and Schedule
The preliminary round and the first two rounds proper are regionalised to reduce teams travel costs.

Participating clubs
The following 49 teams qualified for the competition:

Preliminary round
18 clubs from the Divizia B entered this round. Teams that finished higher on the league in the previous season played their ties away. 8 clubs from the Divizia B received a bye for the preliminary round. Matches were played on 20 April 2019.

First round
17 clubs from the Divizia B and 15 clubs from the Divizia A entered this round. In a match, the home advantage was granted to the team from the lower league. If two teams are from the same division, the team that finished higher on the league in the previous season played their tie away. Matches were played on 3 and 4 May 2019.

Second round
The 16 winners from the previous round entered this round. In a match, the home advantage was granted to the team from the lower league. If two teams are from the same division, the team that finished higher on the league in the previous season played their tie away. Matches were played on 24 and 25 May 2019.

Final stage

Bracket

Round of 16
The 8 winners from the previous round and 8 clubs from the Divizia Națională entered this round. The home teams in the first legs and the pairs were determined in a draw held on 3 June 2019. The first legs were played on 25 and 26 June 2019 and the second legs on 5, 6 and 7 July 2019.

|}

First leg

Second leg

Quarter-finals
The 8 winners from the previous round entered the quarter-finals. The home teams in the first legs were determined in a draw held on 9 July 2019. The first legs were played on 24 and 25 September 2019 and the second legs on 29 and 30 October 2019.

|}

First leg

Second leg

Semi-finals
The 4 winners from the previous round entered the semi-finals. The home teams in the first legs were determined in a draw held on 1 November 2019. The first legs were played on 21 and 22 June 2020 and the second legs on 25 June 2020.

|}

First leg

The match was abandoned after 28 minutes due to heavy rain, and was resumed on Monday 22 June 2020 at the Zimbru Stadium in Chișinău, 20:00 EEST, from the point of abandonment.

Second leg

Final

The final was played on Tuesday 30 June 2020 at the Zimbru Stadium in Chișinău. The "home" team (for administrative purposes) was determined by an additional draw held on 26 June 2020.

Notes

References

Notes

External links
Cupa Moldovei on soccerway

Moldovan Cup seasons
Moldova
Moldovan Cup